Antti-Jussi Jormanpoika Niemi (born 22 September 1977) is a Finnish former professional ice hockey player. Niemi played for Jokerit of the SM-liiga, the Mighty Ducks of Anaheim in the National Hockey League, HC Lada Togliatti in the Kontinental Hockey League and Västra Frölunda HC and Leksands IF of the Swedish Elitserien.

Professional career 
Niemi began his professional career with Jokerit of the SM-liiga. His play attracted the attention of the Ottawa Senators of the National Hockey League, who drafted him in the fourth round of the 1996 NHL Entry Draft, 81st overall. In June 1999, the Senators traded his NHL rights to the Mighty Ducks of Anaheim, along with Ted Donato for Patrick Lalime.

Niemi moved to North America in 2000 to continue his professional career. Niemi played two years in the Mighty Ducks organization, mostly with their minor league Cincinnati Mighty Ducks team, but was called up to Anaheim for a total of 29 games.

Niemi returned to Finland and returned to Jokerit for the 2002–03 season. After one season, Niemi transferred to Frölunda HC of Sweden, where he played five seasons including the 2005 Elitserien championship. The 2008–09 season was split between HC Lada Togliatti of the Kontinental Hockey League and Leksands IF of the Swedish league.

In 2009 Niemi returned again to Finland and Jokerit. He played five more seasons with Jokeriti to finish his career, retiring in 2014. In total, Niemi won two SM-liiga gold medals with Jokerit.

Niemi was member of the Finnish national team at several World Championships, as well as the 2006 Winter Olympics. He was a member of the 2006 silver medal team.

Career statistics

Regular season and playoffs

International

External links

1977 births
Living people
Cincinnati Mighty Ducks players
Finnish expatriate ice hockey players in Russia
Finnish ice hockey defencemen
Frölunda HC players
HC Lada Togliatti players
Ice hockey players at the 2006 Winter Olympics
Jokerit players
Leksands IF players
Medalists at the 2006 Winter Olympics
Mighty Ducks of Anaheim players
Olympic ice hockey players of Finland
Olympic medalists in ice hockey
Olympic silver medalists for Finland
Ottawa Senators draft picks
Sportspeople from Vantaa